Police Interceptors is a British factual programme which profiles the work of elite police units from across the UK. There have to date been 19 series following police units from Essex, South Yorkshire, Derbyshire, Cumbria, Lincolnshire, Durham & Cleveland, Cheshire, West Yorkshire and Nottinghamshire. The current series follows the work of Nottinghamshire Police's Road Policing Unit. The documentary has been broadcast by Channel 5 since the first episode on 9 May 2008.

Series overview

Episodes

Series 1 (2008)
Essex

Series 2 (2008-09)
Essex

Series 3 (2010)
Essex

Series 4 (2011-12)

Series 5 (2013)
Cumbria

Series 6 (2014)
Lincolnshire

Series 7 (2014)
Lincolnshire

Series 8 (2015)
Lincolnshire

Series 9 (2015)
Durham and Cleveland

Series 10 (2016)
Durham and Cleveland

Series 11 (2016)
Durham and Cleveland

Series 12 (2017)
Cheshire

Series 13 (2017)
Durham and Cleveland. This series consists of 12 episodes.

Series 14 (2018)
Durham and Cleveland. This series consists of 13 episodes.

Series 15 (2018)
West Yorkshire. This series has 10 episodes.

Series 16 (2019)
West Yorkshire. This series consists of 15 episodes.

Series 17 (2019) 
West Yorkshire. This series consists of 15 episodes.

Series 18 (2020) 

West Yorkshire. This series consists of 16 episodes.

Series 19 (2021) 

Nottinghamshire . This series consists of 9 episodes.

Series 20 (2021) 
Nottinghamshire. This series consists of 15 episodes.

Series 21 (2022) 
Nottinghamshire.

Notes

References 

2008 British television series debuts
2010s British reality television series
Channel 5 (British TV channel) original programming
Documentary television series about policing
Lists of British crime television series episodes
Lists of documentary television series episodes